David Emslie (born 19 April 1955) is a South African former cricketer. He played in 44 first-class and two List A matches for Eastern Province from 1979/80 to 1987/88.

See also
 List of Eastern Province representative cricketers

References

External links
 

1955 births
Living people
South African cricketers
Eastern Province cricketers
People from Makhanda, Eastern Cape
Cricketers from the Eastern Cape